In homeopathy, arsenicum album (Arsenic. alb.) is a solution prepared by diluting aqueous arsenic trioxide generally until there is little amounts of Arsenic remaining in individual doses. It is used by homeopaths to treat a range of symptoms that include digestive disorders and, as an application of the Law of Similars, has been suggested by homeopathy as a treatment for arsenic poisoning. Since the arsenic oxide in a homeopathic preparation is normally non-existent, it is considered generally safe, although cases of arsenic poisoning from poorly prepared homeopathic treatments sold in India have been reported. When properly prepared, however, the extreme dilutions, typically to at least 1 in 1024, or 12C in homeopathic notation, mean that a pill would not contain even a molecule of the original arsenic used. While Anisur Khuda-Bukhsh's unblinded studies have claimed an effect on reducing arsenic toxicity, they do not recommend its large-scale use, and studies of homeopathic remedies have been shown to generally have problems that prevent them from being considered unambiguous evidence.  There is no known mechanism for how arsenicum album could remove arsenic from a body, and there is insufficient evidence for it to be considered effective medicine (for any condition) by the scientific community.

Use in homeopathy
Arsenicum album is one of the fifteen most important recommendations in homeopathy. In classical homeopathy, people are sometimes assigned a constitutional type, named after the homeopathic remedy applied, partly on the idea that people with similar physical or mental characteristics who suffer from similar symptoms can be treated effectively with their constitutional remedy. "Arsen. alb." types are "tense, restless ambitious individuals" with a tendency toward hypochondriasis, pessimism, need for reassurance, and a meticulous attention to neatness and detail.

For homeopathic use, arsenicum album is prepared by separating arsenic from iron (as in arsenopyrite), cobalt, or nickel by baking at high temperatures. The powder is then ground and diluted with lactose. In the final dilution, statistically most pills will contain zero molecules of the original arsenic used; some might contain a single molecule. The final product is sold as tinctures (liquid), tablets, pellets, or powder.

Key homeopathic uses include attempting to treat anxiety and "fear caused by insecurity", digestive disorders and mucosal inflammation, and ailments characterized symptomatically by burning pain. It was also used once for treatment of syphilis. Without treatment, syphilis can severely damage its patient's heart, brain or other organs, and can be life-threatening. Syphilis can also be passed from mothers to unborn children.

Research studies

Several studies have been done into Arsenicum album; however, homeopathic studies are known to have problems, such as evidence of bias, lack of rigour, and failure to blind the experimenters or subjects to which group is being analyzed that prevent them from being considered definitive evidence for any effect. In addition, the ideas behind homeopathy are scientifically implausible and directly opposed to fundamental principles of natural science and modern medicine, which means that poorly conducted, small, or unblinded studies are not considered scientific proof of efficacy.

References

Homeopathic remedies